Hozier is the debut studio album by Irish musician Hozier. It was released on 19 September 2014 by Island Records and Rubyworks Records. Before the album's release, he attracted attention from his 2013 and 2014 EPs Take Me to Church (2013) and From Eden (2014), which contained songs that were later included on the album. Hozier collaborated with producer Rob Kirwan during its recording. Hozier has been described as a blues, soul and indie rock album with elements of gospel, R&B and folk music.

Hozier received generally positive reviews from music critics, many of whom praised Hozier's songwriting and vocal performance. The record was also commercially successful, reaching top ten positions in Ireland, the United Kingdom, the United States, Canada, Australia, Denmark, and Greece. Five of the album's singles—"Take Me to Church", "From Eden", "Sedated", "Work Song", and "Someone New"—charted in the top-50 of the Irish Singles Chart. The album's lead single, "Take Me to Church", was a huge success worldwide and also earned a nomination for Song of the Year at the 57th Annual Grammy Awards in 2015. Following the release of the record, "Jackie and Wilson" and "Cherry Wine" were released as the album's sixth and seventh singles, respectively.

Background 
Hozier began writing songs at the age of 15. He taught himself guitar and sang in his school choir. He later studied music education at Trinity College Dublin but was refused a year's deferral by the college after missing exams to record demos for a music label. While at Trinity, Hozier became involved with the Trinity Orchestra. He was a member of the choral ensemble Anúna from 2007 to 2012 and appears as a soloist on their 2014 release Illuminations singing "La Chanson de Mardi Gras". He toured and sang with the group internationally including performances in Norway and the Netherlands. Hozier played at Oxegen Festival in 2009 and 2010. In 2011, he opened up for a performance for Alex Winston in Dublin. In 2012, Hozier appeared as a backup singer for Billy Ocean.

Writing and recording
Hozier began writing the album after ending his first relationship, saying it forced him to "reflect" upon what being in love meant, having reasons to "distract" himself and "cultivate his ideas" before "turn(ing) them into music". Hozier has stated that there are "a lot of recurring themes" in the album dealing with "personal liberations - finding yourself, accepting yourself, and making sense of yourself" in trying to be honest about "the more wonderful and awful things of your day-to-day". He describes his initial efforts as "angsty, lonely songwriting that teenagers do". He wrote "Take Me to Church" in his parents' living room and recorded the song in a "makeshift attic studio" in Wicklow, collaborating with producer Rob Kirwan. At a live performance in Boston, Hozier explained that "Cherry Wine" was recorded at five in the morning in an old, abandoned hotel with a caved-in roof and walls covered in graffiti. The cover artwork is a painting made by Hozier's mother Raine Hozier-Byrne, who also did the artworks of the album's singles.

Music and lyrics
Hozier is a blues, soul and indie rock record, featuring elements of gospel, R&B and folk. The album contains an "Americana-rock blend with oily guitar riffs, crashing high-hats, angelic choruses and sung-spoken verses...", characterized by subtle guitar, strong percussion, dark instrumentals, whimsical strings, "soulful" and raw vocals and "haunting" melodies". The standard edition of Hozier is just under an hour long, consisting of thirteen tracks, while the deluxe edition adds four bonus songs to the record. The album was solely written by Hozier, except "Someone New", which was co-written with his former girlfriend Sallay-Matu Garnett. The album was produced by Hozier and Rob Kirwan.

Songs
 
Hozier opens with "Take Me to Church", a gospel-inflected mid-tempo blues song with "sweeping orchestral choruses" showcasing the artist's vocal range ascribing religious terminology to the nuances of a romantic relationship. "Angel of Small Death and the Codeine Scene" is a blues and indie-rock track, containing guitar riffs clapping hands and church organs with a half-time beat, describing a "temptress" in "stained-glass colors", lamenting the unavoidable "curse of being young in love". "Jackie and Wilson" is a bluesy, laid-back soulful rockabilly track, backed by an "angelic choir of harmonies, a tribute to American singer Jackie Wilson. It features "tongue-in-cheek" lyrics musing about a couple "naming their children Jackie and Wilson" while "rais[ing] them on rhythm and blues." "Someone New" is a pop-like whimsical spring-stepped indie-rock song with strong strings, a pizzicato bass and choral harmonies, discussing a wandering celebration of "renewed love" in the face of strangers. "To Be Alone" is melancholy blues song containing a simplistic drumbeat guitar licks and church organs, depicting the "euphoric" attraction of solitude with a partner. 

"From Eden" features a flamenco bridge, referencing the titular garden in its Biblical imagery and describing a journey to "find himself as much as the girl", with the narrator "slithering" to his lover's door. "In a Week" is a Celtic-inspired folk duet with breathy harmonies from Karen Cowley detailing pastoral fantasy about decomposing amongst the fauna of the Wicklow Mountains alongside his love. "Sedated" is a soulful track with tinkling piano and gospel melodies with depicts a "warning" of personal decay within a relationship. "Work Song" is a gothic-spiritual love song with murmurous vocals, tambourine, and a strong melodic bass, discussing a promise of devotion beyond the grave. "Like Real People Do" is an acoustic song in a "warm" higher key with keening vocals, its lyrics intertwining metaphors of insects and nature, while pleading for his sweetheart to kiss him in affection. "It Will Come Back" is a twangy track with "devilish" strings slide guitar riffs and tambourines with deviant notations while "Foreigner's God" has a soulful edge with loaded lyrical and religious allegories. "Cherry Wine" ends the album on an apologetic note with an intimate acoustic live-recording that juxtaposes the samples of chirping birds and soft guitar with the description of a tempestuous, abusive relationship.

Release and promotion

The album was available to pre-order in Europe upon its announcement with North American and Australian pre-order dates from July 2014. The album was released 19 September 2014. The album was distributed by Island Records in most of the world and by Columbia Records in the United States.

Singles
"Take Me to Church" was announced by Hozier as the lead single from the album and was released on 13 September 2013. The song peaked at #2 on the Billboard Hot 100, becoming Hozier's highest-charting single in the U.S. to date. The music video, alluding to themes of homophobia, was released that same month, having been created on a "shoestring budget" and filmed entirely in black-and-white. The video was shared by gay English actor Stephen Fry, which helped it reach the front page of Reddit and subsequently go viral. "Take Me to Church" saw Hozier's rise to prominence, with the song scoring top five positions around the world and gaining multi-platinum certifications; the song also garnered critical acclaim for its lyricism and messaging.

"From Eden" was released as the second single from the album on 9 March 2014. The song peaked at #2 on the Irish Singles Chart. "Sedated" was released as the third single from the album on 20 May 2014. The song peaked at #3 on the Irish Singles Chart. "Work Song" was released as the fourth single from the album on 16 March 2015. "Someone New" was released as the fifth single from the album on 11 May 2015. The song peaked at #13 on the Irish Singles Chart. "Jackie and Wilson" was released as the sixth single from the album on 29 September 2015. "Cherry Wine" was released as the seventh single from the album on 14 February 2016. The track appeared in Zach Braff's movie Wish I Was Here, chosen for its "heartbreaking lyrics and poetry". It was later performed on the Late Late Show.

Tour
Hozier toured the United States and Europe in support of the album across 2014 and 2015, with multiple shows featuring opening act Ásgeir. Irish band Wyvern Lingo opened for his performances in Ireland.

Critical reception

Hozier received generally positive reviews from music critics. At Metacritic, which assigns a normalized rating out of 100 to reviews from mainstream critics, the album received an average score of 79, based on 10 reviews.

AllMusic's Timothy Monger called the album "a strong debut," praising the singer's soulful voice and the quality of the material. "Like fellow Irishman Van Morrison did decades before, Hozier draws on the soul and R&B of Jackie Wilson and runs it through the mystery white-boy filter of Jeff Buckley, adding a touch of Bon Iver's rural indie aesthetic to mix into his own dark cocktail," he wrote. Sergiusz Królak of JazzSoul.pl claimed, "Hozier (...) revealed album with emotionally strong songs," adding that "acoustic-rock-ballad tracklist makes a great whole with deep-emotional vocal and strong lyrics".

Simon Harper of Clash magazine commented that "His voice, more poitín-sweetened than whiskey-soaked, caresses delicate melodies and rougher rhythms alike with confidence – it lingers compellingly in the creeping blues of 'To Be Alone', whispers prettily in the folky 'Like Real People Do', and preaches fervently in the ragged R&B of 'Jackie And Wilson'. The Irishman's storytelling is suitably fluid, relying on the realism of true romance rather than affecting any impoverished Delta designs. As a result, 'Hozier' is an authentic portrait of an artist – soulful, spiritual and seductive – and is a deeply impressive first step."

Rolling Stone magazine's Jon Dolan wrote, "Blessed with a sensual singing voice and a seemingly bottomless well of lapsed-Catholic-style conflict, Hozier channels Van Morrison's Celtic R&B, Southern soul and Black Keys-style garage blues into intimately roiling songs like 'Angel of Small Death and the Codeine Scene'." Helen Brown of The Telegraph noted, "Gospel choirs hum and swell tenderly beneath the rougher edges of his riffs. They add mature, universal gravitas and often a holy ecstacy to an intense, youthful lyrical tangling of religion and romantic obsession that regularly finds him poised 'between love and abuse'," adding that "Hozier mixes his tormented blues with sunny R&B."

Accolades 
"Take Me to Church" received a nomination for the category Song of the Year at the 57th Grammy Awards while Hozier was nominated for the category Top Rock Album at the 2015 Billboard Music Awards and International Album of the Year at the 2016 Juno Awards. Hozier won Best Album at the European Border Breakers Awards, a prize recognising the achievements of international artists outside their home country. Jessica Goodman and Ryan Kistobak of The Huffington Post included the album on their list of 2014's best releases.

Commercial performance
Hozier peaked at number two on the Billboard 200 and  number three on the UK Albums and ARIA Charts. The album ranked at number one on the Rock Albums Chart and the Americana/Folk Chart. The album debuted at number two on the Canadian Albums Chart, selling 8,800 copies in its first week. Hozier also secured Top 15 chart positions in Belgium, Denmark, Holland, and Germany.

As of March 2019, the album has sold 972,000 copies and has earned 2.6 million equivalent album units in the U.S. In Hozier's home country of Ireland, the project started atop with 7,300 units. It has sold 90,000 copies there.

Track listing

Personnel

Credits adapted from AllMusic.

Musicians
 Hozier – vocals, guitar, bass, piano, synthesizer
 Karen Cowley – vocals (track 7)
 Alex Ryan – bass, piano
 Ken Rice – viola, violin
 Kate Ellis – cello
 Matt Rafter – cello
 Andre Antunes – drums, percussion
 Rory Doyle – drums, percussion
 Fiachra Kinder – drums
 Rob Kirwan – percussion

Additional personnel
 Mark James – design
 Raine Hozier-Byrne – artwork
 Steven Appleby – fonts, logo

Technical
 Hozier – producer
 Rob Kirwan – producer, engineer, mixing
 Niall Muckian	– direction
 Roger Quail – A&R
 Andrew Scheps	– mixing
 Stephen Marcussen – mastering

Charts

Weekly charts

Year-end charts

Decade-end charts

Certifications and sales

Release history

References

2014 debut albums
Albums recorded in a home studio
Hozier (musician) albums
Columbia Records albums
Island Records albums
Rubyworks Records albums
European Border Breakers Award-winning albums